The second season of Akademi Fantasia premiered on 7 June 2004 and concluded on 14 August 2004 on the Astro Ria television channel. Aznil Nawawi continued as the show's host, while Kudsia Kahar returned as judges. The second season was won by Ahmad Zahid Baharuddin, who defeated Norlinda Nanuwil. This season also featured Kaer Azami, who would subsequently win the 2008 Malaysian Music Awards for Best Song.

Unlike previous season which was solely opened for people from Peninsular Malaysia, this season was eligible for contestants from East Malaysia. The final 12 contestants were revealed in Tirai Akademi Fantasia which was aired at the end of May and early June.

A new format this season was introduced which enabled a student who was eliminated to be re-entered into the competition through a voting line called AFMASUK. Using this voting line, audience would vote any students who were eliminated throughout the season and the one student who received the highest votes would be re-entered into the competition. This new format is subsequently used in seasons 4, 7 and 8.

This entire season holds the highest reception of votes in the history of Akademi Fantasia with 15 million votes being cast.

Students
(ages stated are at time of contest)

Concerts summaries

Week 1
 Original airdate: 12 June 2004
 Guest judges: Awie & Rashid Sibir
 
 Bottom two: Edlin binti Abdul Rahim (Edlin) & Mohd Fitri bin Zainal Abidin (Fitri) 
 Eliminated: No elimination

Week 2
 Original airdate: 19 June 2004
 Guest judges: Dato' Yusof Haslam & Farihin Abdul Fatah

 Bottom two: Edlin binti Abdul Rahim (Edlin) & Yusrizan bin Usop (Bob) 
 Eliminated: No elimination

Week 3
 Original airdate: 26 June 2004
 Guest judges: Jenny Chin & Radhi OAG

 Bottom two: Edlin binti Abdul Rahim (Edlin) & Nurullah binti Zawawi (Nurul) 
 Eliminated: Edlin binti Abdul Rahim (Edlin)

Week 4
 Original airdate: 3 July 2004
 Guest judges: Kak Cham & Mamat Khalid 

 Bottom two: Mohd Fitri bin Zainal Abidin (Fitri) & Yusrizan bin Usop (Bob) 
 Eliminated: Mohd Fitri bin Zainal Abidin (Fitri)

Week 5
 Original airdate: 10 July 2004
 Guest judges: Andy Flop Poppy & Shuhaimi Baba

 Bottom two: Anding Indrawani bin Zaini (Anding) & Yusrizan Usop (Bob) 
 Eliminated: Anding Indrawani bin Zaini (Anding)

Week 6
 Original airdate: 17 July 2004
 Guest judges: Hetty Koes Endang & Hani Mohsin

 Bottom two: Zarina binti Zainoordin (Zarina) & Asma binti Ghani (Mas) 
 Eliminated: Zarina binti Zainoordin (Zarina)

Week 7
 Original airdate: 24 July 2004
 Guest judges: Saiful Apek & Zainal Abidin

 Bottom two: Nurullah binti Zawawi (Nurul) & Norlinda Nanuwil (Linda) 
 Eliminated: Nurullah binti Zawawi (Nurul)

Week 8
 Original airdate: 31 July 2004
 Guest judges: Anuar Zain & Erma Fatima

 Bottom two: Norlinda Nanuwil (Linda) & Asma binti Ghani (Mas) 
 Eliminated: Norlinda Nanuwil (Linda)

Week 9 (Semifinal)
 Original airdate: 7 August 2004
 Guest judges: Jalaluddin Hassan & Misha Omar

 Bottom two: Asma binti Ghani (Mas) & Yusrizan bin Usop (Bob) 
 Eliminated: Asma binti Ghani (Mas) 
 AF MASUK: Norlinda Nanuwil (Linda)

Week 10 (Finale)
 Original airdate: 14 August 2004
 Guest judges: Farihin Abdul Fatah & Mamat Khalid 
1st Round Performance

2nd Round Performance

 Sixth place: Wan Mohammad Khair bin Wan Azami (Kaer) 
 Fifth place: Yusrizan bin Usop (Bob)
 Fourth place: Farah Diana binti Anuar (Farah) 
 Third place: Mohammad Aizam bin Mat Saman (Adam)
 Runner-up: Norlinda Nanuwil (Linda) 
 Winner: Ahmad Zahid bin Baharuddin (Zahid)

Elimination chart
Voting Result in Rank Order

  Winner
  Runner-up
  Third place
  Finalist
  AF MASUK
  Saved
  Eliminated

Trivia
 Week 1 and Week 2 featured non-elimination concerts. The accumulated votes were forwarded to the following week.
 In week 9, Linda was re-entered into the competition after scoring the highest votes through AFMASUK.

Cast members

Hosts
 Aznil Nawawi - Host of concert, Imbasan Akademi Fantasia and Diari Akademi Fantasia.

Professional trainers
 Ramlie M.S. - Principal & Music Director
 Adnan Abu Hassan - Vocal Technical
 Corrie Lee - Choreographer
 Linda Jasmine - Choreographer
 Dr. Abdullah Sher Kawi Jaafar - Motivator Consultant
 Fatimah Abu Bakar - Student Consultant
 Fauziah Nawi - Stage Presentation
 Siti Hajar Ismail - Voice Tone
 Mahani Awang - Image Consultant
 Roslina Hassan - Resident Manager

Judge
 Kudsia Kahar

Season statistics
 Total number of students: 12
 Oldest student: Mohd Fitri Zainal Abidin, 25 years old
 Youngest student: Farah Diana Anuar & Wan Mohammad Khair Wan Azami, both 19 years old
 Tallest student: Wan Mohammad Khair "Kaer" bin Wan Azami, 5'10.5" (179 cm)
 Shortest student: Nurullah Hamid, 4'11" (150 cm)
 Heaviest student: Yusrizan Usop, 205 lb (93 kg)
 Lightest student: Nurullah Abdul Hamid, 82 lb (37 kg)

References

External links
 Akademi Fantasia Season 2
 Weekly Concert of Akademi Fantasia

Akademi Fantasia seasons
2004 Malaysian television seasons